Leiding is a surname. Notable people with the surname include:

Jeff Leiding (1961–2014), American football player
Rudolf Leiding (1914–2003), German Volkswagen executive

See also
Leiding Township, St. Louis County, Minnesota